The outbreak of the Kelantan Rebellion in 1915 has attracted much attention from scholars but there is much disagreement over what actually was the cause of the rebellion. It remains to be an area of Kelantan's history that is still debated amongst scholars, whether these scholars have studied the rebellion through the British colonial sources or whether they have studied the folk version of the rebellion. Both versions present very different interpretations of the motivations behind the rebellion. However, what is agreed upon by both sides was that the rebellion was centered on “a venerable-looking bearded gentleman” - Haji Mohd Hassan bin Munas, known as Tok Janggut (Old Long Beard).

Overview  
The rebellion began at a public meeting to discuss the new land tax when Tok Janggut killed a police sergeant who was attempting to arrest him on the 29 April 1915. The district officer of Pasir Putih, Abdul Latif escapes with his family along with all the money in the Treasury. Before fleeing, he had sent out a message to the British Adviser in Kota Bahru seeking for help. The British Adviser, upon receiving the news, dispatched a regiment of Sikh and Malay police officers to Juaran, a place located between Pasir Putih and Kota Bahru. News of the uprising reaches the Sultan of Kelantan, who sent two Malay ministers to arrest  Tok Janggut and restore order. Tok Janggut demanded a full royal pardon as a condition for halting the uprising- a demand that was rejected by the Sultan. In the meantime, the rebels had occupied Pasir Putih town, ransacked government buildings and burned down several shophouses. The British authorities had sent a military force, the Malay States Guides (A Sikh Regiment) to Pasir Putih. On 24 May 1915, Tok Janggut and the rebels attacked the Malay States Guides where Tok Janggut was killed in the crossfire. The rebels are routed and Tok Janggut's body was taken back to Kota Bahru cand carried around on a bullock cart for members of the public to see. The body was then hanged in a public field before being taken down and buried about an hour later.

Before investigating or debating the various causes which brought about the rebellion, it would be important to understand the location as well as the manner in which Kelantan was being administered to fully grasp the situation in which the rebellion arose. The segment below would show the manner in which Kelantan was being governed and how it affected the people during the various periods of change.

Administration of Kelantan (1902- 1915) 
Although the Kelantan rebellion had been popularly viewed as a peasant uprising, it has to be noted that prior to the rebellion, there were changes to the administration which had eroded the privileges of the traditional leaders – chiefs, aristocrats and the ruler. This erosion of the traditional privileges had brought about the arousal of hostility and bitterness amongst the traditional leaders. Kelantan was brought under the control of British authorities who had made an agreement with Siam in the Anglo-Siamese Treaty of 1902 which saw the appointment of two British officers, W.A. Graham and H.W. Thomson to oversee the administration of Kelantan. Significantly, the British administration was able to bring under its control, 1904 square miles of mineral-rich land previously leased by the Sultan of Kelantan to a British entrepreneur-R.W Duff.

In addition to acquiring the resource rich land, Graham also made some reforms to the administration. For example, he reaffirmed the status of the Sultan as well as restructured the government services and created some new departments, including a State Treasury. The State Treasury oversaw all payments and receipts collected for the administration. Graham also transformed the existing police force into a more efficient and responsible unit. New courts were also set up and they operated alongside the Muslim syariah court. To make administration more efficient, Graham also divided the British territory into three districts - Kota Bahru, Ulu Kelantan and Pasir Putih. Each of these districts would have their own magistrate, land officer as well as revenue collector.

These actions eroded the privileges and power of the traditional leaders because previously, all revenue collected was done exclusively by the Sultan, his family as well as the members of the nobility but with Graham's reforms, the Sultan would have to be satisfied with what the British allocated to him. In order to avoid any form of rebellion, Graham appointed the Sultan's family members as head of the various government departments.  This arrangement continued until 1909 when Kelantan was formally transferred from Thai to British control under the agreement of the Anglo-Siamese Treaty of 1909. Graham's successor, J.S Mason oversaw new developments in Kelantan's administration. Among these changes was the formal recognition that Britain would oversee Kelantan's foreign relations and the Sultan would also agree to appoint a British Adviser and “to follow and give effect to the advice of the Adviser….in all matters of administration other than those touching the Mohammedan religion and Malay custom.”

Kelantan's District Administration 1903-1915 
Graham's administration had appointed district officers to oversee the district and village chiefs. In the past, these district and village chiefs were responsible for the collection of taxes but under the British administration, the money was collected by the State Treasury which thus gave more power to the District Officers. In land administration, Graham had initiated a system that would differentiate land which was presented as a gift by the Sultan and which ones were sold between consenting parties. Graham's successors Mason and J.E. Bishop carried on with the system, albeit transferring land legal disputes from the civil courts to the Land Office. When W. Langham-Carter assumed the position of British Adviser, he introduced a land register which compiled the names of all the land-owners in Kelantan. This system was meant to create a more comprehensive British administration to be able to collect taxes more efficiently and to encourage the peasants to cultivate rice and other crops on the land.  Langham-Carter then further enhanced this system by introducing a system where land taxes were based on four classes of land. Regardless of whether the land was being cultivated or not, all land-owners were to pay land-rent. This system came into effect on 1 January 1915.

Political conspiracy 
During the years of 1900 up until the outbreak of the rebellion in 1915, it had been mentioned that the reforms initiated by the British administration had eroded some of the privileges previously held by the traditional leaders. Scholars have also pointed out that there was much Court intrigue within the Kelantan palace. Tuan Long Senik had succeeded Sultan
Mansur in February 1900 and assumed the title of Sultan Senik after the latter's death but his ascension was not welcomed by members of the royal family. Among them would be Tuan Long Senik's uncle, Tuan Long Jaafar who was bypassed for the position as well as Tungku Chik Penambang who was overlooked for the position of Raja Muda – the next in line after the Sultan. Sultan Senik was rendered powerless as his relatives as they were allowed to veto his orders and amassed large estates of land. The grudge against the Sultan by his relatives was evidently apparent to W.A. Graham who mentioned that “Seven of the most powerful of his uncles and other relatives formed a league by the strength of
which combination they extracted from him privileges to which, without such cohesion, they could never have aspired”.

Interpretations  
The Kelantan Rebellion had been portrayed in a wide array because many scholars have disagreed as to what really caused the outbreak of the uprising. The rebellion had been seen and interpreted as;
 A Jihad (Holy War) against Britain following the outbreak of World War One.  In this war, Britain was part of the Triple Entente (An alliance consisting of Britain, France and Russia) who were fighting against the Triple Alliance (Consisting of Germany, Austria-Hungary and the Ottoman Empire). The Ottoman Empire was an Islamic nation and had called upon all Muslims to support its efforts against the British, French and Russians. This interpretation is a popular one in Malaysia, with school textbooks publishing this assessment of the reason for the Kelantan uprising.
 A peasant rebellion caused by the unhappiness stemmed from the new land tax and the harsh methods used by the District Officer to collect these taxes
 As a protest / rebellion against the Sultan for accepting British administration and an attempt to oust him from power.
 As a political manoeuvre by the Sultan to strengthen his position and oust those against him.

The Rebellion as a Jihad (Holy War) 
In this interpretation of the rebellion, much of the works done centred on Tok Janggut biography and life experiences and how this would shape his worldview to rebel against the British as part of a Jihad. Although there have been scant historical evidence which detailed Tok Janggut's personal life, the romanticised image of Tok Janggut as an Islamic warrior still remains strong in the psyche of the people in Malaysia. Much of the interpretation stems from folk tales which depict him as a freedom fighter who would resist even the Sultan for
fighting what he believed was a just cause and that he was considered to be “a man of some learning and consequent repute in an unlettered community”.   His
years of sojourn in Mecca implies that he was a religious man and that would be used by later generations of historians to portray him as an Islamic militant
who launched Jihad, despite there being no historical evidence to show that his rebellion was done in the name of Islam. Nevertheless, the political context in which the rebellion took place did offer a point of argument why some historians portrayed the rebellion as an Islamic struggle.

In 1915, Britain was involved in the First World War and this took a drain on its ability to fully control its colonies. Scholars have also pointed out that the British also had faced problems from within its own ranks where the Muslim soldiers from the Indian regiment were unhappy at rumours that they would be sent to Europe and fight against the Ottoman troop-their Muslim brethren. This unhappiness from the Indian soldiers led them to conduct a mutiny against the British authorities in Singapore. This event came to be known as the Singapore Mutiny (also known as the Sepoy Mutiny) and lasted from January until March 1915 before the British were able to restore order and had the mutineers executed. Nevertheless, this mutiny signalled to the leaders in Kelantan that the British were losing the war in Europe and that they would not be able to deploy reinforcements in time to quell their uprising.

Despite the lack of evidence that the rebellion was carried out as a Jihad, many generations of historians have tried fitting him into this image as a righteous Islamic warrior. For example, in Yahya Abdullah's 1955 book, Peperangan Tok Janggut, atau Balasan Derhaka shows an image of a handsome, well-groomed man with a white pointed beard and turban on his head. Similarly, in Rubaidin Siwar's Pemberontakan Pantai Timor (1980), Tok Janggut was portrayed with a turban, a long beard and a newly added long robe which makes him appear to look like an Islamic radical- this image fits the context of the time whereby there was a rise in the international radical Islamic movement.

The sustainability of this romanticised portrayal of Tok Janggut had much to do with much of the information and pictures not being made publicly known, which places an air of mystery and intrigue over the entire rebellion. However, by allowing the romance of Tok Janggut to remain, it keeps emphasising ideals and fantasies at the expense of reality. One such sentiment that has continued to be told was that Tok Janggut was invulnerable and skilled at Silat (a form of Martial arts practised mainly in the Malay Peninsula). As the anthropologist James Boon analysed the term “romance”, he points out that;

“Romance portrays vulnerable, disguised protagonists, partial social misfits who sense surpassing ideals and must prove the ultimate feasibility of actualising those ideals often against magical odds…..Romance properly concerns champions rather than heroes…..they are surrounded by signs and tokens of semi-miraculous birth, prone to mythical insights, and are acquainted with the natural and rustic orders more intimately than their privileged aristocratic counterparts.”

Despite the shortage of evidence suggesting a political Islamic awakening behind the rebellion, some scholars have engaged in inserting present-day concerns into the historical interpretations thus portraying a romanticised image of Tok Janggut which would cause “prejudices and preconceptions to slip in unnoticed and skew our reading of the
evidence”.

Unhappiness stemming from the new land tax 
Langham-Carter had initiated a new system of land tax whereby all land owners were to pay land-rent whether the land was being cultivated or not. Failure to pay their taxes on time would result in further penalties, usually a fine and are forbidden from using the plot of land for their cultivation for the next year. This policy was greeted with unhappiness amongst the large landowners especially members of the royal family who felt that such taxation laws would hinder their desire to gain more land under their own control. Under this policy, even the Sultan was not exempted from paying the land tax when Langham-Carter insisted that the Sultan had to pay $1800 a year for a 3000-acre plot of land.

Before the land tax was initiated, farmers in Kelantan were paying their taxes based on what they produced (Produce tax). When Langham-Carter implemented the land tax, it was meant to actually replace the Produce tax but this was not properly explained to the people in Kelantan. Now, the peasants saw the land tax as an addition to the tax they were already
paying for their produce hence increasing their financial burden and frustration towards the British authorities. Apart from their financial frustration, they were also unhappy that the District Officer responsible for the collection of taxes was not appointed from amongst the locals but instead was appointed from outside Kelantan.

This aversion to be accountable to someone not from the area was already seen during the time of W.A. Graham when in 1905, appointed Encik Ibrahim as District Officer for Pasir Puteh. Encik Ibrahim was from Singapore and the district officer overseeing the tax collection in 1915 was Che Abdul Latif, also from Singapore. This suspicion of outsiders was further aggravated especially since the district officer, who was usually understaffed, took a long time to collect the taxes from the peasants. The peasants were subjected to long queues before
they were able to pay their dues. Matters were also not made more conducive especially when the officials were often high handed towards the peasants when collecting the taxes. Such actions only served to create mistrust and suspicion among the peasants towards the British authorities who were not more understanding of the struggle of the peasants.

Their frustration was further heightened in 1915 when most of the peasant's land yielded a poor harvest but were not exempted from paying their land tax. On top of that, the long queues at the District Officer's headquarters meant that some of the peasants were in the queue for three consecutive days. Among those in the queue were Tok Janggut and a few of his followers who, after getting tired of waiting, simply left the area. For this act, the district officer, Che Abdul Latif would dispatch Sergeant Che Wan to
arrest Tok Janggut for his alleged refusal to pay his taxes. Tok Janggut, along with other influential local leaders would instigate the peasants to rebel against the land tax which was deemed to be too punitive onto the peasants. Sergeant Che Wan would eventually be stabbed to death after a heated argument with Tok Janggut and this would then officially start the Kelantan Rebellion in 1915.

The peasant rebellion in Pasir Putih mainly highlighted the point that the peasants were unhappy at having to change their traditional way of life, including the way in which their taxes were being accounted and collected. They had felt that the newly implemented British laws had burdened and made their lives more difficult than it used to be. On another note, the British tax laws had also neglected to address Islamic law with regards to land ownership and tax. The Islamic law in question was based on the principal of effort or Ihya rather than land. This principle differed greatly from the British model of taxation and when complaints to the British authorities went unheeded, the peasants joined in the rebellion led by Tok Janggut as a platform to express their discontent at the British policies.

A rebellion against the Sultan and an attempt to oust him from power 
The reluctance of local, principally Malay Muslim, scholars to examine the anti-feudalist nature of Tok Janggut's rebellion can be attributed to the sacrosanct image that the Malay rulers enjoyed until Malaysia's landmark 1993 constitutional amendment that removed their immunity from criminal charges. Under this section, the rebellion was carried out by Tok Janggut as part of an anti-royalty or lese-majeste action. According to this interpretation, the rebellion was seen to be a criticism of the Kelantan Sultan relationship with his people as well as the role and conduct during the rebellion. Although this interpretation is not found within the official Malay and British narrative, it does provide an interesting account over why the
rebellion took place. Tok Janggut was a commoner, glorified by the people as he resisted the British government in the cause of social justice and political
freedom, defying the Sultan's authority because of the latter's support of British policies as well as his own quest for personal revenge against the Sultan. This story is presented mainly as a form of conflict between tradition and modernity, and between resistance and authority. It can also be interpreted as a subtle critique of the Malay feudal leaders and the values that they uphold.

Tok Janggut defied feudal authority, just like his father, Monas had before him. Monas had two sons, Mat Tahir and Mat Hassan (Tok Janggut). Mat Tahir was killed by a retainer of the Sultan. When Monas tried to appeal to his master, Tungku Seri Maharaja Tua for justice to be served, his pleas were largely ignored. Monas became angry and sought to ruin his master's life. He took his master's favourite concubine, Wan Serang Bulan against her will and when this information reached his master's ears, he had Monas executed. Monas was killed just as he was bending down to scoop water to wash his face before prayers. His executioner, Pak Sulung Bulat had thrust a spear into the neck of Panglima Monas.

This execution occurred just before Mat Hassan returned from Mecca where he had left to seek religious knowledge and to perform his pilgrimage, which was one of the five obligations of Islam. He was a man who was always willing to assist anyone in hardship, regardless of race. He also hated any oppressor and would take actions to ensure that people who oppress others were punished. Hence, when the opportunity to seek revenge for his father's death presented itself, Tok Janggut would use the opportunity to galvanise the peasants to rebel against the British authorities. When the Sultan tried to negotiate with the rebels by sending two of his ministers, they defied his authority. This would then prompt the Sultan to declare the rebels as penderhaka (treasonable behaviour) and to seek British assistance to quell the rebellion. The actions of the Sultan would corroborate J. de V. Allen's study which states that several members of the royal family, especially the uncles were collaborating with Ungku Besar, the Pasir Putih chief in a bid to oust him. Allen pointed out that by the Sultan seeking the British help; it showed that his authority within the royal circles was not strong that he had to seek British assistance to defend his position on the throne.

The Sultan's “Double Game”
The Sultan is traditionally viewed as a willing partner in adapting to the changes in administration in Kelantan who would administer the state on the advice of the British Adviser. Most scholars had stayed away from examining the role that the Sultan played due to the lese-majeste law in which the Sultan and others of the royal family could not be criminally charged under the Malaysian constitution. Thus, any charge against the Sultan was brushed aside and kept away from public knowledge. After the rebellion broke out, W. Langham-Carter had accused the Sultan of playing a “double-game”- a charge that was levelled against the Sultan after the British authorities had absolved him from any blame in the rebellion. Nevertheless, newly available British colonial records have shown that unlike the cooperative pro-British individual, the Sultan was in fact sympathetic towards the rebels and was able to manipulate events to oust Langham-Carter from his position as British Adviser.

Prior to the outbreak of the rebellion, it was officially recognised that the Sultan and Langham-Carter had some disagreements over several issues. The major disagreement was with regards to the conduct of the District Officer Che Abdul Latif. The Sultan had sent a series of petitions, showing his displeasure at Abdul Latif's temperament and treatment of the local population. Langham-Carter, sided with Abdul Latif and disagreed with the Sultan's assessment and pointed out that Abdul Latif's actions were in line with his enforcing of the British land laws at the time. The Sultan had also petitioned on three occasions to the Governor to have Langham-Carter replaced which showed just how fractured their relationship were. A sore point mentioned by the Sultan was the fact that Langham-Carter had an inadequate grasp of Malay and of Malay customs.
 
When the rebellion broke out, disagreements broke out between Langham-Carter and the Sultan over how they should manage the situation. The Sultan had wanted to use his own local forces and resolve the matter through negotiations. Langham-Carter, on the other hand had wanted a quick and decisive military victory and hence summoned for military assistance from Singapore. The Sultan was accused by Langham-Carter and other British officials as minimising the seriousness of the rebellion because prior to the arrival of British reinforcements, it was agreed that the Sultan would use his own officials and armed levies to meet the rebels and would hand complete control over to the British once their reinforcements arrived. This was something that the Sultan kept trying to prevent over the next few days.

A few other incidents raised the British suspicions that the Sultan himself was involved in the rebellion. Firstly, despite the increased tensions which saw the Sultan intensify security around the palace, he was not agreeable to the rebels offer to stand down in return for a royal pardon, something that the British saw as the Sultan minimising the seriousness of the threat. Secondly, when the Sultan's minister Dato Setia returned from his negotiation with the rebels, he gave much information regarding the numbers, dispositions as well as the rebel plans which the British suspected as being concocted to prevent action by the British troops. Furthermore, the British troops encountered delaying tactics by the local population to make their passage as difficult as they could. Nevertheless, the Sultan was unable to obstruct the British force, which eventually arrived to deal with the rebels. The Sultan eventually issued draconian proclamations against the rebels and when the uprising was eventually brought back to order, the Sultan issued another proclamation that saw the residents of Pasir Putih having to pay a fine within 15 days or risked having their house burned to the ground.

It was interesting to note that the Sultan was able to portray himself as being accommodating towards the British officials by issuing punitive fines to show his support towards the British and yet at the same time project suspicious behaviour which saw the British seeing the Sultan as being in cahoots with the rebels themselves. This delicate balancing act by the Sultan ensured that the British could never implicate him as a recalcitrant ruler.  Overall, compromise, accommodation and opposition had been the changing strategies of the Sultan in his political game with Langham-Carter and other British officials. But what seems to have contributed to his eventual triumph was probably the Sultan's correct reading of the minds of his British antagonists. He would eventually get his request accepted in seeing Langham-Carter removed from his position and replaced by R.J. Farrer, a man the Sultan had requested as the British Adviser in his initial request to the Governor.

References 

1915 in Asia
History of Kelantan